

Introduction 
Asian Science Camp 2016, was organised by jointly by Department of Science and Technology, Government of India and Indian Institute of Science from 21 August to 27 August, 2016. The venue for the program was J N Tata Auditorium, Indian Institute of Science, Bangalore, India.

Speakers 
The main speakers in Tenth Asian Science Camp, 2016 were:
 Dr. C. N. R. Rao
 Dr. J. Georg Bednorz
 Prof. Raghvendra Gadagkar
 Dr. Cedric Villani
 Dr Takaaki Kajita
 Dr Ajay K Sood

Program Overview 
The following activities were planned during the Asian Science Camp 2016.

Academic Program 
 Plenary lectures by Distinguished Scientists (Distinguished Awardees from Asia and Nobel Laureates)
 Individual lectures pertaining to different disciplines
 Laboratory demonstrations
 Panel discussions
 Theme Presentations by students
 Poster presentation by students

Sightseeing and excursions 

 Visit of historical places in Bangalore and in Mysore
 Visit of science and technology museum
 Cultural program

Participation 
Participation in the ASC 2016 was through invitation only. The Organizing Committee sent an invitation to the contact person of each country/region to announce the ASC 2016 to high schools and universities, so as to initiate the local process to select student delegates. The last date for receiving the nominations was 30 April 2016.

There was no registration fee, and the Organizing Committee provided the living and local expenses of participants associated with ASC 2016.

Around 240 students, including 200 from abroad and 40 from India participated in the camp. in addition there were 40 overseas mentor and 30 organizing committee members.

Accommodation 
Accommodation for the speakers was arranged at The Taj Vivanta, Yeswanthpur, Bangalore.

Accommodation for other participants was arranged at 37th Crescent Hotel, Bengaluru, Hotel Bangalore International, Crescent Road, Bengaluru and Goldfinch Hotel, Bengaluru.

See also 
 Sixth Asian Science Camp
 Fourteenth Asian Science Camp

References 

2016 in education
August 2016 events in India
2016 in science
2016 in India
Science events
Youth science
Youth conferences